"Paris by Night" is a song by French singer Amanda Lear released in 2005.

Song information 
"Paris by Night" is an uptempo dance song written by Giovanbattista Giorgilli, Amanda Lear, and Roberto Paesani. Its English-French lyrics invite to explore Parisian nightlife, and Lear herself offers to be the guide to the city. The lyrics name-check Folies Bergère and Champs-Élysées. The song was also recorded entirely in French as "Paris la nuit".

"Paris by Night" was originally released in Italy as a 14-track CD maxi single with multiple remixes by Italian DJs and producers. In Germany, it was released as a CD single as well as a limited edition picture disc (500 copies) with different artwork. The song was a minor chart hit in Italy where it peaked at no. 43. It also entered the radio airplay chart in Russia.

Track listing 
CD Maxi-Single (2005)
"Paris by Night" (DIY Cool Edit) – 3:20
"Paris by Night" (DIY Elektro Edit) – 3:25
"Paris la nuit" (Union Boys Edit) – 3:23
"Paris la nuit" (Lab Short RMX) – 3:39
"Paris by Night" (Original Edit) – 4:05
"Paris la nuit" (Original French Edit) – 4:05
"Paris by Night" (DIY Cool Mix) – 6:17
"Paris by Night" (Bini's Virus Dub) – 6:33
"Paris by Night" (DIY Elektro Mix) – 5:18
"Paris la nuit" (Union Boys Extended) – 5:20
"Paris la nuit" (Lab Extended RMX) – 5:48
"Paris by Night" (Original Mix) – 6:00
"Paris la nuit" (Original French Mix) – 6:00
"Paris by Night" (Piol Paradise Remix) – 6:48

12" Single (Italy, 2005)
A1. "Paris by Night" (DIY Cool Mix) – 6:17
A2. "Paris by Night" (DIY Elektro Mix) – 5:18
B1. "Paris by Night" (Bini's Virus Dub) – 6:33
B2. "Paris by Night" (Piol Paradise Remix) – 6:48

12" Picture Disc (Italy, 2005)
A1. "Paris by Night" (Original Mix) – 6:02
A2. "Paris by Night" (Piol Paradise Remix) – 6:50
B1. "Paris by Night" (DIY Elektro Mix) – 5:20
B2. "Paris by Night" (DIY Cool Mix) – 6:19

CD Maxi-Single (Germany, 2005)
"Paris by Night" (Original Edit) – 4:05
"Paris by Night" (DIY Cool Edit) – 3:25
"Paris by Night" (Bini's Virus Dub) – 6:33
"Paris by Night" (Original Mix) – 6:00
"Paris by Night" (Piol Paradise Remix) – 6:50

Chart performance

References 

2005 singles
2005 songs
Amanda Lear songs
Songs about Paris
Songs about nights
Songs written by Amanda Lear